The following is a list of African-American Republicans, past and present. This list is limited to black Americans who have worked in a direct, professional capacity in politics.

A
 David Abner (1826–1902), Republican State Representative from Texas, 1874–1875, vice-president of Republican State Convention 1876
 Dinah Abrahamson (1954–2013), author, Republican member of the Nebraska State Central Committee
 Ali Alexander (born 1984 or 1986), Social media personality and activist, of African-American and Arab ancestry.
 Archie Alexander (1888–1958), governor of the U.S. Virgin Islands
 Walter G. Alexander (1880–1953), first African-American to serve in the New Jersey Legislature
 Aris T. Allen (1910–1991), chair of the Maryland Republican Party
 Claude Allen (born 1960), White House Domestic Policy Advisor
 Ethel D. Allen (1929–1981), Secretary of the Commonwealth of Pennsylvania, first African-American elected to Philadelphia City Council
 Richard Allen (1830–1909), member of the Texas House of Representatives
 James W. Ames (1864–1944), representative in the Michigan House of Representatives
 Renee Amoore (1953–2020), health care advocate & founder and president of The Amoore Group, Inc.; former candidate for Republican National Committee co-chairwoman
 John D. Anthony (born 1976), member of the Illinois House of Representatives from the 75th district (2013–2016)
 Caesar Antoine (1836–1921), 13th Lieutenant Governor of Louisiana
 Benjamin W. Arnett (1838 - 1906), elected to Ohio General Assembly 1885
 Alexander Asberry (1861–1903), member of the Texas House of Representatives

B

 Pearl Bailey (1918–2001), singer, appointed "America's Ambassador of Love" by Richard Nixon.
 Anna Simms Banks (1862–1923), first female delegate at the Kentucky's 7th congressional district Convention in Kentucky
 Jose Celso Barbosa (1857–1921), medical doctor, sociologist, political leader, one of the first persons of African descent to receive a medical doctor degree in the United States, founder of Republican Party of Puerto Rico
 Martin G. Barnes (1948–2012), Mayor of Paterson, New Jersey
 Alfred S. Barnett, (1858-1905), Journalist, civil rights activist
 Ferdinand Lee Barnett, (1852 -1936), Journalist, lawyer, first African-American assistant State Attorney
 Ferdinand L. Barnett, (1834-1932), Member, Nebraska House of Representatives (1926-1928)
 Houston A.P. Bassett (1857–1920), member of the Texas House of Representatives
 Andrea Barthwell (b. 1953/1954), former Deputy Director for Demand Reduction at the Office of National Drug Control Policy
 Tony Barton (born 1961), pastor, member of Kansas House of Representatives 2015–2017
 Thomas Beck (1819–?), member of the Texas House of Representatives
 Ashley Bell, National Director of African American Engagement Office and the Director of the Small Business Administration's Southeast Region
 Walter Blackman, Arizona state representative
 J. Kenneth Blackwell (born 1948), former Ohio State Treasurer and Secretary of State; 2006 Republican candidate for Governor of Ohio
 Donald Blakey (born 1936), member of the Delaware House of Representatives
 Edward David Bland (1848–1927), member of the Virginia House of Delegates
 Michelle Bernard (born 1963), journalist, author, columnist
 Lynette Boggs (born 1963), Las Vegas City Councilwoman, former Clark County, Nevada commissioner, former candidate for the U.S. House of Representatives
 Claude M. Bolton Jr. (1945–2015), United States Assistant Secretary of the Army for Acquisition, Logistics, and Technology (2002–2008)
 Mary Booze (1878–1955), RNC member from Mississippi
 Deneen Borelli, (born 1969), conservative author, radio and television personality and columnist
 Harrison N. Bouey (1841 - 1909), elected Probate Judge, Edgefield County South Carolina in 1875, elected county sheriff in 1876, but was not allowed to take office
 Jesse Freeman Boulden (1820 - 1899), elected Mississippi House of Representatives 1869
 Peter Boulware (born 1974), NFL linebacker and Republican candidate for the Florida House of Representatives, District 9.
 Neal E. Boyd (1975–2018), opera singer and former candidate for the Missouri House of Representatives
 Jennette Bradley (born 1952), former Treasurer of the State of Ohio
 Julian Bradley (born 1981), Wisconsin State Senator
 Randy Brock (born 1943), State Auditor of Vermont, State Senator of Vermont
 Stephen Broden (born 1952), conservative commentator, Life Always board member (an anti-abortion organization) and evangelical pastor, 2010 Congressional candidate
 Edward Brooke (1919–2015), U.S. Senator from Massachusetts, first African American elected by popular vote to the U.S. Senate
 Hallie Quinn Brown (1845–1949), an educator, writer and activist
 Janice Rogers Brown (born 1949), U.S. Court of Appeals judge, California Supreme Court judge, and civil servant
 Jeremiah A. Brown (1841 - 1913), elected to Ohio House of Representatives 1885
 Reginald J. Brown (1940–2005), Assistant Secretary of the Army (Manpower and Reserve Affairs) (2001–2005)
 Solomon G. Brown (1829 - 1906), served in Washington, D.C. House of Delegates (1872 - 1874)
 Tony Brown (born 1933),  a journalist, academic, businessman and commentator of the television show Tony Brown's Journal
 Blanche Bruce (1841–1898), U.S. Senator from Mississippi, first African American to serve a full term in the U.S. Senate
 C.L. Bryant (born 1956), Baptist minister, radio & television host
 J. Mark Burns (born 1979), pastor and candidate for U.S. House of Representatives in South Carolina
 Nannie Helen Burroughs (1878–1961), educator, activist and feminist
 Walter Moses Burton (1840–1913), member of the Texas State Senate
 William Owen Bush (1832–1907), member of the Washington State Legislature
 Keith Butler (b. 1955/1956), Republican national committeeman from Michigan, former councilman for Detroit, minister and former U.S. Senatorial candidate
 William F. Butler, politician, president of the Negro Republican Party, delegate to Republican National Convention 1872
 Yvonne Brown (1952–2012), first female black Republican mayor in Mississippi
Dr. Lisa Noel Babbage, great granddaughter of Charles Babbage, father of the Computer. Educator, author, Congressional Candidate from Georgia 2019.

C

 Herman Cain (1945–2020), businessman, media personality, and 2012 candidate for President of the United States
 Lawrence Cain (1844 - 1884), elected to South Carolina House of Representatives 1868 and to South Carolina Senate 1872
 Richard H. Cain (1825–1887), U.S. Representative from South Carolina
 Daniel Cameron (born 1985), 51st Attorney General of Kentucky
 Tony Campbell (born 1965), author, pastor, and 2018 candidate for US Senate in Maryland
 Francis Lewis Cardozo (1836–1903), South Carolina Treasurer and South Carolina Secretary of State
 Archibald Carey Jr. (1908–1981), appointed by President Dwight D. Eisenhower as chair of his committee to reduce racial discrimination
 Selwyn Carrol (1928–2010), member of the Alaska House of Representatives 1973–1975, county auditor of Hampton County, South Carolina
 Jennifer Carroll (born 1959), Lieutenant Governor of Florida
 Ben Carson (born 1951), political commentator, pediatric neurosurgeon, 2016 presidential candidate, and Secretary of Housing and Urban Development under President Donald Trump (2017–2021)
 Stefani Carter (born 1978), member of the Texas House of Representatives
 Wilt Chamberlain (1936–1999), basketball player, supported Richard Nixon for president in 1968 and 1972, accompanied Nixon to funeral of Martin Luther King Jr.
 Juan Chastang (b. 1961/1962), Mobile County, Alabama Commissioner
 Ron Christie (born 1969), adviser to Vice-President Dick Cheney
 Octavius Valentine Catto (1839–1871), civil rights activist and African American baseball pioneer
 Julius Caesar Chappelle (1852–1904), legislator (1883–1886), Massachusetts House of Representatives
 Henry P. Cheatham (1857–1935), U.S. Representative from North Carolina
 Robert Church Jr. (1885 - 1952), Founder, Lincoln League Memphis, Tennessee, eight times a delegate to the Republican National Convention.
 Robert Reed Church (1839 - 1912), Banker, 1900 delegate from Tennessee to the Republican National Convention.
 Solomon T. Clanton (1857 - 1918), In 1892, he was an at large delegate from Louisiana to the Republican National Convention
 Eldridge Cleaver (1935–1998), author and civil rights leader
 Garry Cobb (born 1957), NFL Linebacker, 2014 nominee for New Jersey 1st Congressional District
 Abram Colby (1800s), representative in the Georgia House of Representatives
 Harry A. Cole (1921–1999), first African-American elected to the Maryland Senate and serve on the Maryland Court of Appeals
 William Thaddeus Coleman Jr. (1920–2017), fourth United States Secretary of Transportation, first African American Supreme Court Clerk
 Ward Connerly (born 1939), political activist, businessman, and former University of California Regent
 Frank Cousins (born 1958), first African-American sheriff in Massachusetts
 Robyn Crittenden, Georgia Secretary of State and first African-American woman to serve as a statewide constitutional officer in Georgia
 Jane Powdrell-Culbert (born 1949), member of the New Mexico House of Representatives
 Norris Wright Cuney (1846–1898), Chairman of the Texas Republican Party (1886–1896)
 Green Currin (1842/1844–1918), member of the Oklahoma Territorial Legislature

D

 Randy Daniels (born 1950), Secretary of State of New York, 2006 Gubernatorial candidate
 Christopher Darden (born 1956), lawyer, O.J. Simpson trial prosecutor 
 Stacey Dash (b. 1966/1967), actress and former talk show host and candidate for California's 44th congressional district in the 2018 Congressional Election
 Artur Davis (born 1967), Democratic Alabama Congressman, speaker at 2012 Republican National Convention, Republican (2012–2015)
 Ruth A. Davis (born 1943), diplomat and 24th Director General of the United States Foreign Service
 Richard A. Dawson (1848 - 1906), served in the Arkansas State Senate (1873 - 1874).  He was a Republican before 1900, and a Democrat afterwards.
 William L. Dawson (politician) (1886 - 1970), served on the Chicago, Illinois City Council as a Republican (1933 - 1939).  Switched to Democrat in 1939 and was afterward elected to Congress as a Democrat. 
 Paris Dennard (born 1982), former White House aide to George W. Bush, CNN and NPR contributor 
 Timothy DeFoor (born 1961 or 1962), Pennsylvania Auditor General since 2021, first African-American elected to a statewide office in Pennsylvania
 William B. Derrick (1843 - 1913), Clergyman, active in civil rights and Republican politics
 Diamond and Silk Lynnette Hardaway ("Diamond") and Rochelle Richardson ("Silk"), live-stream video bloggers, political activists, and former Fox Network hosts
 Lurita Doan (born 1958), former administrator of the United States General Services Administration
 Jessie De Priest (1870–1961), Music teacher, wife of Congressman Oscar Stanton De Priest, her presence at a White House tea given by Lou Henry Hoover June 12, 1929, caused a scandal among southern Democrats.
 Oscar Stanton De Priest (1871–1951), U.S. Representative from Illinois
 Robert DeLarge (1842–1874), South Carolina congressman
 Shamed Dogan (born 1978), Missouri State Representative (2015–present)
 Byron Donalds (born 1978), U.S. Representative (FL) and former Florida State representative
 Frederick Douglass (1818–1895), abolitionist, editor, orator, author, and statesman
 Willie Dove (born 1945), Kansas State Representative
 Antoine Dubuclet (1810–1887), State Treasurer of Louisiana
 Damon Dunn (born 1976), former football player, politician
 Oscar Dunn (1826–1871), 11th Lieutenant Governor of Louisiana
 Edward Duplex (1831–1900), Mayor of Wheatland, California (1888)

E
 Larry Elder (born 1952), talk radio host and commentator, candidate in the 2021 California gubernatorial recall election
 Robert Brown Elliott (1842–1884), U.S. Representative from South Carolina
 Clark Ervin (born 1959), first Inspector General of the US Department of Homeland Security
 James Evans, Chairman of the Utah Republican Party
 Melvin H. Evans (1917–1984), U.S. Representative from, and former Governor of the U.S. Virgin Islands
 Charles Evers (1922–2020), civil rights leader, Mayor of Fayette, Mississippi

F
 James Farmer (1920–1999), civil rights leader
 Michel Faulkner (born 1957), pastor, defensive lineman for the New York Jets, a 2010 nominee for New York's 15th congressional district
 Crystal Bird Fauset (1894–1965), first female African-American state legislator in the United States
 William A. Feilds (between c. 1846 and 1852–1898), member of the Tennessee House of Representatives
 William Webb Ferguson (1857–1910), first African-American man elected to the Michigan House of Representatives
 Ada Fisher (born 1947), Republican National Committee woman for North Carolina
 Arthur Fletcher (1924–2005), official in the administrations of Presidents Nixon, Ford, Reagan, and George H.W. Bush; considered the "father of affirmative action"
 Timothy Thomas Fortune (1858-1928), orator, author, publisher, civil rights activist, Customs Inspector, Eastern District of Delaware (1874)
 Ezola Foster (1938-2018), teacher, political activist, 1986 Republican nominee for 48th District of the California Assembly. She later ran for other offices on the tickets of other parties.
 Gary Franks (born 1953), U.S. Representative from Connecticut
 Jendayi Frazer (born 1961), former U.S. Assistant Secretary of State for African Affairs
 Ryan Frazier (born 1977), Aurora City Councilman, 2010 nominee for Colorado's 7th congressional district
 Samuel B. Fuller (1905–1988), founder and president of the Fuller Products Company, publisher of the New York Age and Pittsburgh Courier, head of the South Side Chicago NAACP, president of the National Negro Business League, and a prominent black Republican
 Virginia Fuller, 2010 and 2012 Congressional Candidate
 Walt Furnace (born 1943), member of the Alaska House of Representatives 1983–1991

G
 Matthew Gaines (1840–1900), community leader, minister, and Republican Texas State Senator.
 James Garner, mayor of the Village of Hempstead, New York, 2004 Congressional candidate
 Althea Garrison (born 1940), former member of the Massachusetts House of Representatives
 Robert A. George, editorial writer for the New York Post, blogger and pundit
 Mifflin Wistar Gibbs (1823–1915), American consul to Madagascar
 Jonathan Clarkson Gibbs (1821–1874), Secretary of State of Florida and Florida Superintendent of Public Instruction
 John Gibbs, HUD official in the Trump administration, Candidate for congress in Michigan.
 James Golden, producer on the Rush Limbaugh radio talk show
Walter A. Gordon (1894–1976) 18th Governor of the United States Virgin Islands
 Elisha Winfield Green (c. 1815–1893), Baptist minister, elected vice-president Kentucky Negro Republican Party 1867
 James Monroe Gregory (1849–1915), appointed to the board of trustees of the Washington, D.C. public schools in 1886,   delegate to the 1892 Republican National Convention
 William Henry Grey (1829 - 1888), represented Phillips County, Arkansas at Arkansas Constitutional Convention in 1868, he served in the Arkansas House of Representatives for Phillips County (1868 - 1869), elected to the Arkansas State Senate in 1875, served as Clerk of the First Circuit Court and ex-offico Recorder of Deeds in 1870, in 1872, he became Arkansas Commissioner of Immigration and State Lands.
 Rosey Grier (born 1932), former professional football player, Protestant minister, actor and former candidate for Governor of California, 2018
 Archibald Grimké (1849–1930), an American lawyer, diplomat, and national vice-president of the NAACP
 Elbert Guillory (born 1944), former state senator in Louisiana's 24th district

H
 George W. Haley (1925–2015), attorney, diplomat, policy adviser, elected to Kansas State Senate 1964, former chief counsel, Federal Transit Administration, former general counsel, U.S. Information Agency, candidate for U.S. House of Representatives from Kansas in 1966, candidate for United States Senate from Maryland in 1986, former ambassador to The Gambia
 Ken Hamblin (born 1940), radio host, political commentator, author, television personality
 A. C. Hamlin (1881–1912), member of the Oklahoma House of Representatives
 Jenean Hampton (born 1958), 57th Lieutenant Governor of Kentucky (2015–2019)
 Lionel Hampton (1908–2002), musician, delegate to several Republican National Conventions, vice-chairman New York State Republican Committee
 Jeremiah Haralson (1846–1916), U.S. Representative from Alabama
 Ineitha Hardaway (1971–2023), political commentator
 Bill Hardiman (born 1947), Michigan State Senator, 2010 Congressional Candidate
 Greg Hardy (born 1988), mixed martial artist, former NFL defensive end
 Erika Harold (born 1980), 2003 Miss America, delegate to the 2004 Republican National Convention, 2012 Congressional Candidate
 Bruce Harris (born 1951), mayor of Chatham Borough, New Jersey
 James H. Harris (1828–1898), member of both the North Carolina House of Representatives and North Carolina Senate
 Paul Clinton Harris (born 1964), member of the Virginia House of Delegates
 Lewis Hayden (1811–1889), elected to the Massachusetts State Legislature
 Henry E. Hayne (1840–?), former senator in the South Carolina Senate and Secretary of State of South Carolina
Robert C. Henry (1921–1981) first African-American mayor in Ohio, mayor of Springfield, Ohio
 Curtis Hill (born 1961), 43rd Attorney General of Indiana
 Mike Hill (born 1958), state representative in the Florida House of Representatives
 James Sidney Hinton (1834–1892), state representative in the Indiana House of Representatives
 Joseph H. Holland, Commissioner of the New York State Department of Housing and Community Renewal
 William H. Holland (1841–1907), member of the Texas House of Representatives
 Amy Holmes (born 1973), political commentator and independent social conservative
 Lester Holt (born 1959), journalist and news anchor, Republican until 2018, Independent since.
 Deborah Honeycutt (born 1947), 2006, 2008, 2010 congressional candidate;
 Perry Howard (1835–1907), represented Holmes County, Mississippi in the Mississippi House of Representatives (1872 - 1875) and served on the county board of supervisors.
 Perry Wilbon Howard (1877–1961), Attorney from Mississippi and delegate to the RNC from 1912 to 1960
 T.R.M. Howard (1908–1976), Mississippi civil rights leader, surgeon, entrepreneur and mentor to Medgar Evers and Fannie Lou Hamer
 Wesley Hunt (born 1981), U.S. Representative from Texas
 Will Hurd (born 1977), U.S. Representative from Texas, CIA analyst
 Zora Neale Hurston (1891–1960), folklorist, anthropologist, novelist, short story writer
 Lynn Hutchings (born 1960), member of the Wyoming House of Representatives
 John Adams Hyman (1840–1891), U.S. Representative from North Carolina

I
 Niger Innis (born 1968), commentator and activist

J
 Alphonso Jackson (born 1945), thirteenth Secretary of Housing and Urban Development
 Alvin B. Jackson, Former member of the Utah State Senate
 Raynard Jackson , political consultant and political analyst for WUSA*9 TV (CBS affiliate) in Washington, DC
 Richard E. Jackson (born 1945), Commissioner of the New York State Department of Motor Vehicles; first African-American mayor of a city in New York State
 Conrad James (born 1974), member of the New Mexico House of Representatives
 John E. James (born 1981), U.S. Representative from Michigan and candidate for the U.S. Senate from Michigan in 2018 and 2020
 Kay Coles James (born 1949), director for the United States Office of Personnel Management 2001–2005, President of the Heritage Foundation (2018-2021), Virginia Secretary of the Commonwealth nominee
 Dr. Mildred Fay Jefferson (1927–2010), first African-American woman to graduate from Harvard Medical School; anti-abortion movement leader; Republican candidate for U.S. House and U.S. Senate
 Wallace B. Jefferson (born 1963), Chief Justice of the Supreme Court of Texas
 Edward A. Johnson (1860–1944), member of the New York State Assembly
 James Weldon Johnson (1871–1944), first Black manager of the NAACP, president of the Colored Republican Club
 Peter K. Jones (1834–1895), member of the Virginia House of Delegates
 Scipio Africanus Jones (1863–1943), Arkansas delegate to the Republican National Convention
 Shandy W. Jones (1816-1886), member of the Alabama House of Representatives (1868 - 1870).
 Vernon Jones (born 1960), member of the Georgia House of Representatives 1993 to 2001 and since 2017.  Originally a Democrat, he switched to Republican in January 2021.
 E.W. Jackson, (born 1952), GOP nominee for Lt. Governor of Virginia in 2013, President of STAND and CETF, Marine Corps Veteran, and graduate of Harvard Law School

K

 Alan Keyes (born 1950), diplomat, media personality and nominee for the U.S. Senate in Maryland and Illinois
 Alveda King (born 1951), minister, political activist, author, niece of Martin Luther King Jr.
 Don King (born 1931), boxing promoter, attended 2009 Republican National Convention
 Mabel King (1932–1999), television and film actress
 Martin Luther King, Sr., (1899–1984), pastor, missionary, civil rights activist
 Kimberly Klacik (born 1982), former candidate for congress in Maryland's 7th district.

L
 Stephen N. Lackey (born 1980), public affairs advisor, social entrepreneur, fundraiser
 Charles Henry Langston (1817 - 1890), Republican Presidential Elector from Kansas 1872 for Ulysses S. Grant
 John Mercer Langston (1829 - 1897), member, United States House of Representatives from 4th District of Virginia (1890 - 1891) 
 Harry LaRosiliere (born 1962), Mayor of Plano, Texas
 Jim Lawrence (born 1971), member of NH House of Representatives (2002–2008), 2014 candidate for 2nd NH Congressional District
 George Logan (born 1969), former member of Connecticut State Senate
 W. H. Logan (born first half of 1850's), Arkansas Justice of the Peace, served in Arkansas State Senate, District 15 (1889 - 1890)
 Jefferson Franklin Long (1836–1901), U.S. Representative from Georgia
 Nic Lott (born 1979), Chairman for the Mississippi Young Republicans and Mississippi College Republicans
 Bruce LeVell, businessman, and executive director of National Diversity Coalition for Donald Trump's 2016 presidential campaign
 William H. Lewis (1868–1949), United States Assistant Attorney General
 C.N. Love (died 1946), Journalist, active in the Black-and tan faction of the Republican Party in Houston, Texas.
 Mia Love (born 1975), U.S. Representative for Utah's 4th congressional district (2015–2019)
 Samuel R. Lowery (1830–1900), lawyer
 John Roy Lynch (1847–1939), U.S. Representative from Mississippi
 Ernest Lyon (1860–1938), Methodist clergyman, former United States Ambassador to Liberia, and founder of the Maryland Industrial and Agricultural Institute for Colored Youths

M

 Leo Mackay Jr. (born 1961), deputy secretary of the United States Department of Veterans Affairs
 Omarosa Manigault Newman (born 1974), Assistant to President Donald Trump January 3, 2017 to January 20, 2018. Democrat prior to 2015, Republican 2015 to 2019, Independent since 2019.
 Kenneth Mapp (born 1955) governor of the United States Virgin Islands (2015–2019) (elected as an Independent)
 Lenny McAllister (born 1972), political analyst, community activist, television and radio host, author, 2013 Congressional candidate
 Edward P. McCabe (1850–1920), Treasurer of Logan County, Oklahoma
 William Madison McDonald (1866–1950), State Chairman of the Republican Party of Texas
 Angela McGlowan (born 1970), political analyst and 2010 Congressional candidate
 James Meredith (born 1933), civil rights leader
 Michael the Black Man (b. Maurice Woodside 1980), musician, operator of several websites, campaigned for President Trump holding a Blacks for Trump sign
 Leon P. Miller (1899–1980) first African-American judge in West Virginia 
 Thomas Ezekiel Miller (1849–1938), U.S. Representative from South Carolina
 Arthur Wergs Mitchell (1883-1968), active in Republican politics in Chicago, Illinois until 1932, when he switched to Democrat and represented Illinois In the United States House of Representatives (1935-1943).
 Charles Lewis Mitchell (1829 - 1912), member of the Massachusetts State Legislature (1866 - 1867)
 Robert J. Moore (1844–?), member of the Texas House of Representatives
 Walthall M. Moore (1886–1960), first African American to serve in the Missouri state legislature
 Clement G. Morgan (1859–1929), Boston attorney, civil rights activist, and city official
 Eric Motley (born 1972), former Deputy Associate Director, Office of Presidential Personnel in Bush Administration
 George Washington Murray (1853–1926), U.S. Representative from South Carolina
 E. Frederic Morrow (1909–1994), first African-American to hold an executive position at the White House.  He served under President Dwight D. Eisenhower as Administrative Officer for Special Projects from 1955 to 1961.
 Deroy Murdock (born 1963), columnist.

N
 Sophia A. Nelson (born 1967), lawyer, author, political commentator
 Constance Berry Newman (born 1935), U.S. diplomat; former Assistant Secretary of State for African Affairs; member of International Republican Institute
 William Nickerson Jr. (1879–1945), businessman, publisher, candidate for presidential elector on the Republican ticket of Dewey-Bricker in 1944

O
 James E. O'Hara (1844–1905), congressman from North Carolina
 Edwin R. Overall (1835-1902), abolitionist, civil rights activist, civil servant, politician, candidate for Nebraska Legislature 1880, 1882, 1890
 Burgess Owens (born 1951) U.S. Congressman (Utah, district 4) and former NFL player
 Candace Owens (born 1989), political commentator
 Jesse Owens (1913–1980), athlete

P

 Rod Paige (born 1933), seventh U.S. Secretary of Education
 Barrington D. Parker (1915–1993), judge of the District Court for the District of Columbia
 Sherman Parker (1971–2008), Missouri state representative, ran for U.S. House of Representatives
 Star Parker (born 1956), author, political commentator, 2010 Congressional candidate
 Lynne Patton (born 1972), Regional Director, Housing & Urban Development, 2016 RNC Keynote Speaker
 Patrick Penn, member, Kansas House of Representatives, elected 2020, took office January 11, 2021
 Edward J. Perkins (born 1928), first African-American U.S. ambassador to South Africa
 Jesse Lee Peterson (born 1949), civil rights activist and founder of Brotherhood of New Destiny
 Joseph C. Phillips (born 1962), actor, columnist and commentator
 Pio Pico (1801–1894), last governor of Mexican California.  Formed the Republican Party in California.
 Samuel Pierce (1922–2000), Housing and Urban Development Secretary
 Katrina Pierson (born 1976), Communications Consultant, National Spokesperson Donald Trump 2016 Presidential Campaign, Senior Advisor 2020 Re-Election
 Mazi Melesa Pilip, Ethiopian-born American politician
 P. B. S. Pinchback (1837–1921), twenty-fourth governor of Louisiana; first African-American governor of a U.S. state
 Colin Powell (1937 - 2021), 65th United States Secretary of State
 Michael Powell (born 1963), 24th Chairman of the FCC
 Joe Profit (born 1949), former Atlanta Falcons player; candidate for U.S. House of Representatives in Georgia
 Pierre-Richard Prosper (born 1963), Bush Administration war crimes official

R

 Joseph H. Rainey (1832–1887), U.S. Representative from South Carolina, first African American to serve in the U.S. House of Representatives
 Benjamin F. Randolph (1820–1868), State Senator in the South Carolina State Senate
 Oliver Randolph (1882–1951), second African American elected to the New Jersey Legislature
 Tony Randolph (born 1966), member of the South Dakota House of Representatives, District 35
 James T. Rapier (1837–1883), U.S. Representative from Alabama
 Hiram Rhodes Revels (1827–1901), U.S. Senator from Mississippi, first African American to serve in the U.S. Senate
 Condoleezza Rice (born 1954), 66th United States Secretary of State
 Herneitha Richardson, political commentator 
 Matthew Ricketts (1858–1917), member of the Nebraska House of Representatives
 Adelbert H. Roberts (1860-1937), Member Illinois House of Representatives (1918-1922), Member, Illinois Senate (1924 - 1934)
 Frederick Madison Roberts (1879–1952), first African-American in the California State Assembly
 Shack Roberts Meshack Roberts was elected to the State Legislature of Texas from the 5th District in 1873 and for two later terms, the last from the 10th District.
 Jack E. Robinson III (1960–2017), party nominee for U.S. House, U.S. Senate, and Secretary of the Commonwealth in Massachusetts
 Mark Robinson (born 1968), Lieutenant Governor of North Carolina since 2021
 Joe Rogers (1964–2013), Lieutenant Governor of Colorado, youngest Lieutenant Governor in Colorado history
 Carson Ross (born 1946), Mayor of Blue Springs, Missouri, former Missouri state rep
 Jackie Robinson (1919–1972), baseball player (changed parties after Goldwater nomination).
 George Thompson Ruby (1841–1882), member of the Texas State Senate
 George Lewis Ruffin (1834–1886), attorney, judge, Massachusetts state legislator, and Boston city councilman 
 Boyd Rutherford (born 1957), Lieutenant Governor of Maryland, 2015–present

S

 Dwayne Sawyer (born 1966), State Auditor of Indiana
 Darrell C. Scott, pastor, co-founder of National Diversity Coalition for Trump
 Emmett Jay Scott (1872–1957), educator, journalist, author, active in Republican politics, public relations adviser to every Republican National Convention from 1928 to 1948
 Paul H. Scott (born 1982), Michigan State Representative
 Tim Scott (born 1965), U.S. Senator from South Carolina, first African-American senator to win election in the South since Reconstruction and former Representative South Carolina's 1st Congressional District
 Marvin Scott (born 1944), congressional Candidate
 Winsome Sears (born 1964), Lieutenant Governor of Virginia, member of the Virginia House of Delegates, 2004 Congressional Candidate.
 Tara Setmayer (born 1975), former Communications Director for Republican Rep. Dana Rohrabacher in the U.S. House of Representatives (2006–2013) and current CNN Political Commentator (2014–present)
 T. W. Shannon (born 1978), Former speaker of the Oklahoma House of Representatives
 Roscoe Simmons (1881–1951), journalist, orator, and political activist
 John Andrew Singleton, (1895-1970), Member, Nebraska House of Representatives (1926-1928), afterward became a Democrat
 Millard F. Singleton, (1859-1930), Justice of the Peace, 8th Ward, Omaha, Nebraska (1895), Alternate delegate to Republican National Convention 1892
 Robert Smalls (1839–1915), U.S. Representative from South Carolina
 John J. Smith (1820–1906), abolitionist and Massachusetts state representative
 Joshua I. Smith (born 1941), appointed commissioner of Minority Business Development by President George H. W. Bush
 Robert Lloyd Smith (1861–1942), member of the Texas House of Representatives
 Thomas S. Smith (1917–2002), member of the New Jersey General Assembly
 John H. Smythe (1844 1908), United States Ambassador to Liberia (1878 1881) and (1882 - 1885)
 Clay Smothers (1935–2004), member of the Texas House of Representatives
 DeForest "Buster" Soaries (born 1951), former New Jersey Secretary of State
 Angela Stanton-King (born 1977), Former congressional candidate in Georgia's 5th district
 Michael Steele (born 1958), political commentator, former Lieutenant Governor of Maryland, former candidate for the U.S. Senate in 2006 and former elected chairman of the Republican National Committee (2009–2010)
 Shelby Steele (born 1946), author
 James H. Stewart (1859–1924), member of the Texas House of Representatives
 McCants Stewart (1877–1919), lawyer
 Thomas Stith III (born 1963), member of the city council of Durham, North Carolina, 2004 Candidate for Lieutenant Governor, 2007 mayoral candidate for Durham, North Carolina, Chief of Staff to Governor Pat McCrory
 Louis Wade Sullivan (born 1933), Secretary of the U.S. Department of Health and Human Services
 Carol M. Swain (born 1954), author and professor at Vanderbilt University
 Lynn Swann (born 1952), NFL player and former Pennsylvania gubernatorial candidate

T

 Willie Talton, representative in the Georgia General Assembly
 Enrique Tarrio, (b.1984 or 1985), Henry "Enrique" Tarrio, identifies as Afro-Cuban, candidate in 2020 Republican primary for Florida's 27th Congressional district, but withdrew,  Florida state director of Latinos for Trump
 Noel C. Taylor (1924–1999), mayor of Roanoke, Virginia (1975–1992)
 Arthur Teele (1946–2005), assistant Secretary of Transportation
 Leo Terrell (Born 1955), American civil rights attorney and talk radio host
 Mary Church Terrell (1863 - 1954), Member, District of Columbia Board of Education (1895 - 1906), she was President of the Women's Republican League during Warren G. Harding's 1920 presidential campaign, she was a charter member of the National Association for the Advancement of Colored People
 Robert Heberton Terrell (1857 - 1925), in 1902, he was appointed Justice of the Peace for Washington, D.C., in 1911, he was appointed to the Municipal Court of Washington, D.C.
 Clarence Thomas (born 1948), associate justice of the United States Supreme Court
 John W. E. Thomas (1847 - 1899), member, Illinois House of Representatives 2nd District (1877 - 1879), 3rd District (1882 - 1886)
 Thurman Thomas (born 1966), Buffalo Bill, Republican activist, supported and campaigned for 2010 New York Republican Gubernatorial nominee Carl Paladino
 Larry Thompson (born 1945), United States Deputy Attorney General
 Benjamin S. Turner (1825–1894), Alabama Congressman
 Scott Turner (born 1972), member of the Texas House of Representatives

U
 Sheryl Underwood (born 1963), comedian, actress, television host
 James L. Usry (1922–2002), mayor of Atlantic City, New Jersey
 Jill Upson (born 1966), West Virginia House of Delegates

V
 William T. Vernon (1877–1941), Register of the Treasury under President Theodore Roosevelt
 Joy Villa (born 1986), singer, songwriter, actress, YouTuber, has expressed an interest in running for Congress as a Republican

W

 Dale Wainwright (born 1961), former associate justice of the Texas Supreme Court
 Edward G. Walker (1830 -1901), served as a Republican in the Massachusetts State Legislature (1866 - 1867), later joined the Democratic Party, and still later the Negro Party.
 Herschel Walker (born 1962), football player, bobsledder, sprinter, and mixed martial artist, active in several Republican campaigns, addressed 2020 Republican National Convention in support of President Trump
 George Wallace, Georgia state senator during the Reconstruction era, expelled on September 12, 1868, due to his race
 Josiah T. Walls (1842–1905), Former U.S. Representative from Florida, and one of the first African-Americans to serve in the U.S. House
 Booker T. Washington (1856–1915), educator and activist
 Maurice Washington (born 1956), Nevada state senator
 J. C. Watts (born 1957), U.S. Representative from Oklahoma
 Ida B. Wells (1862–1931), civil rights advocate and co-founder of the NAACP
 Cindy Werner (born 1959), State Ambassador - Frederick Douglass Foundation-WI, former school board trustee, 2022 Lt. Governor candidate - WI
 Allen West (born 1961), Texas Republican Party Chairman and former U.S. Representative from Florida
 John Francis Wheaton (1866–1922), a former member of the Minnesota House of Representatives
 George Henry White (1852–1918), former U.S. representative from North Carolina
 James White (born 1964), a current member of the Texas House of Representatives
 James T. White (1837 - 1892), member of the Arkansas House of Representatives and Arkansas Senate in the late 1860s.
 Ruben B. White served in the Arkansas Senate (1873 - 1874)
 J. Ernest Wilkins Sr. (1894–1959), former Assistant Secretary of Labor under President Eisenhower
 Armstrong Williams (born 1962), radio and television commentator
 Benjamin Franklin Williams (1819–1886), member of the Texas House of Representatives
 Michael L. Williams (born 1953), Texas Railroad Commissioner
 Butler R. Wilson (1861–1939), Boston civil rights activist
 David S. Wilson (born 1981), member of the Alaska Senate (2017–present)
 Jackie Winters (1937–2019), member of the Oregon State Senate
 LaMetta Wynn (born 1933), mayor of Clinton, Iowa (1995–2007)

Y
 James H. Young (1860–1921), politician
 William F. Yardley (1844–1924), anti-segregation advocate, first African American candidate for governor of Tennessee (1876)

See also

 Black conservatism
 Hip Hop Republican
 Lists of African Americans
 National Black Republican Association
 Negro Republican Party
 Southern strategy
 List of American conservatives
 Black conservatism in the United States

References

Further reading

External links
 Republicans for Black Empowerment
 Hip Hop Republican
 The First Blacks in Congress Were All Republicans, NBRA

Black conservatism in the United States
Republicans
 Republicans
 African-American
United States politics-related lists
Conservatism-related lists
Lists of American politicians
Republican Party (United States)-related lists